Matías Di Gregorio (born 4 June 1986 in Buenos Aires) is an Argentine football defender and midfielder.

Club career

Independiente
Di Gregorio began his playing career in 2006 with Club Atletico Independiente, where he made his youthful career too. His debut was on 16 June 2007 in a 1–3 away win against Gimnasia de Jujuy. On 15 March 2008, he scored his first goal against Gimnasia La Plata in a 3–1 Independiente's victory at Primera División. He participated with a great performance on the tour of the United States and Canada, playing 3 games against Columbus Crew, Atlanta Silverbacks and Toronto FC.

Quilmes
In 2009, he dropped down a division to play for Quilmes Atlético Club in Primera B Nacional, playing 23 games, scoring a free kick in the first match of the league. He had a strong performance in the league, being protagonist in many games, achieving promotion of Quilmes Atlético Club to the Argentine Primera División.

Atlético Rafaela
In 2011, he signed for Atlético de Rafaela to play in Primera División.

3 de Febrero
Di Gregorio signed in 2012 for 3 de Febrero, where he had his best year, playing 40 games and scoring 8 goals. He was one of the figures of the team during the league.

Naval de Talcahuano
Actually he plays for Naval de Talcahuano, in the Chilean Primera División B, constituting a fundamental piece for the team.

Atlético Pinto
In November 2014, it was confirmed, that Di Gregorio joined the Spanish side Atlético Pinto.

References

External links
 Argentine Primera statistics at Futbol XXI  
 Di Gregorio to Atlético de Rafaela 
 lapelotaesmia.cl
 www.lacremaesdeprimera.com.ar
 Diario El Sol
 lapelotaesmia.cl
 www.soccerassociation.com
 www.soccerway.com

1986 births
Living people
Footballers from Buenos Aires
Argentine footballers
Association football defenders
Club Atlético Independiente footballers
Atlético de Rafaela footballers
Quilmes Atlético Club footballers
Club Atlético 3 de Febrero players
Naval de Talcahuano footballers
Primera B de Chile players
Argentine Primera División players
Expatriate footballers in Chile
Expatriate footballers in Paraguay